Nothing but ice ("Nothing except ice", "Nichego, krome l'da" ) is a short science fiction story, written by Dmitri Bilenkin. It is also the name of a stories collection by Bilenkin.

Characters and Events 

Story discusses emotional experience of the starship crew members, who faced an interesting dilemma - to blow up the distant star in an immense scientific experiment with the consequences of destroying the planet which looks like a masterpiece of Nature or to leave the star system empty-handed losing the great opportunity of giving the Earth a key to the Universe. The story has an open end, i.e. no resolution of this dilemma is given.

External links 
  Nothing but ice, English translation

Science fiction short stories
Soviet science fiction
1970s science fiction works